General elections were held in the U.S. state of Rhode Island on November 3, 2020. To vote by mail, registered Rhode Island voters must request a ballot by October 14, 2020.

State offices

State Senate

State House of Representatives

Federal offices

President and vice president of the United States

U.S. Senate

U.S. House of Representatives

See also
 Elections in Rhode Island
 Politics of Rhode Island
 Political party strength in Rhode Island

References

External links
  (State affiliate of the U.S. League of Women Voters)
 
 
 
 

 
Rhode Island